NCIC Inmate Communications (NCIC) owns and operates the largest employee-held inmate telephones company in the world. As of June 2019, the company served a total of over 750 prisons in over 8 countries.  and is certified in all US states and Canada. Headquartered in Longview, Texas, NCIC processes over 500,000 calls per day.

References

External links 
Official website

Telephone services